Alvarlu (also Romanized as Alvārlū and Ālvārlū; also known as Alwari and Gūzī Raj‘īn) is a village in Zanjanrud-e Pain Rural District, Zanjanrud District, Zanjan County, Zanjan Province, Iran. At the 2006 census, its population was 123, in 21 families.

References 

Populated places in Zanjan County